Don Carney was the stage name of Howard Rice (August 19, 1896 – January 14, 1954), an American radio personality and children's radio show host. Carney was best remembered as the host of Uncle Don, a children's radio program produced between 1928 and 1947 and broadcast from WOR in New York.

Early life
Don Carney was born Howard Rice on August 19, 1896, in St. Joseph, Michigan and was educated in Michigan public schools. Rice left home and entered the vaudeville circuit at a young age. He began performing stock Irishman parts. It was performing these parts at the age of 15 when he first used the stage name Don Carney. Carney traveled throughout the Midwest in stock shows before settling as an announcer at WOR in New York in 1924.

Career

Uncle Don
In 1928, the station premiered Uncle Don, a children's radio program hosted by Carney. The program featured "Uncle Don", as Carney was dubbed, singing, playing the piano, telling stories and introducing many different events pertaining to the lives of the children, dubbed as Don's "nieces" and "nephews", who listened to the program. Some segments of the program included the "Healthy Child's Club" and the "Talent Quest". Winners of the Talent Quest were sometimes offered movie screen tests.

Except for the small amount of time during the mid-1930s when the show was broadcast nationally from the newly formed Mutual Broadcasting System, Uncle Don aired five, sometimes six, times a week, Monday through Saturday afternoons with occasionally a story or two on Sunday mornings, over WOR in New York. Carney soon generated possibly the largest audience of any locally produced children's show in broadcasting history.

The "little bastards" rumor

Uncle Don ended abruptly in 1947 and for a long time there was speculation in regards to how and why the program ended. The reality is that he simply left the program, but a popular urban legend is that Carney was fired after an embarrassing incident at the conclusion of a 1947 broadcast. According to the legend, after ending his program with his usual "Goodnight, little friends, good night" sign off, Carney thought he was off the air and exclaimed, "There! That ought to hold the little bastards"—but his microphone was still live, and his comment was broadcast to his radio audience. The legend goes on to state that public outrage caused Carney's termination from radio.

The story subsided after a while. But, shortly after Carney's death in the mid-1950s, a man by the name of Kermit Schaefer resurrected the story once again. Schaefer was a radio and television writer/producer during the 1950s and 1960s, who also produced some classic comedy and jazz records on the Jubilee label. Schaefer was best known for his collection of "bloopers" – radio and television mistakes, gaffes, malaprops, spoonerisms, and tongue twisters. Schaefer's "bloopers" later became the inspiration for the television shows TV's Bloopers & Practical Jokes and America's Funniest Home Videos. A 1974 motion picture, Pardon My Blooper, featured many of Schaefer's collected works.

After Carney died, Schaefer featured a "recording" of the "little bastards" incident on his Bloopers album. The legend has since been proved to be just that, a legend. The "recording" was proven to be just a fabricated recreation of the legend. In reality, Carney left New York in 1947 for Miami.

Later career and death
Carney moved to Miami, Florida where he again hosted his own children's radio program at WKAT in Miami Beach, Florida. He suffered from heart failure in his last years and died Thursday January 14, 1954 at his home in Miami at the age of 57. His final show aired the previous Wednesday. He was never married nor did he have any children. He was cremated shortly after his death.

References

External links

Radio personalities from New York City
1896 births
1954 deaths
People from St. Joseph, Michigan